"Him" is a 1983 single by Sarah Brightman. It peaked at #55 in the UK charts.

Track listing 
 "Him"
 "Memory"

1983 singles
Sarah Brightman songs
Song articles with missing songwriters

1983 songs